Ecobici is the bicycle sharing system launched in February 2010 by the government of Mexico City.

History

And indeed, statistics from August 2013 showed 95,780 members registered; daily ridership averaged 25,000, versus 14,000 in December 2012; monthly ridership averaged 400,000.

By October 2013, the system covered the areas:
 Historic center (Centro Histórico)
 part of Colonia Guerrero
 Colonia Tabacalera
 Colonia San Rafael
 Colonia Cuauhtémoc
 Colonia Juárez including the Zona Rosa
 Colonia Roma Norte and Colonia Roma Sur
 Condesa
 San Miguel Chapultepec
 Escandón
 Anzures
 Polanco

In February 2014 it was announced that the system would be extended (Phase IV) with 2600 additional cycles and 170 new stations in the Benito Juárez borough, in the area bordered by Viaducto, Avenida Cuauhtémoc, Circuito Interior and Avenida Revolución, covering the colonias:
Acacias
Ciudad de los Deportes
Del Valle Centro, Norte, and Sur
Extremadura Insurgentes
Noche Buena
Nápoles
Narvarte
San Pedro de los Pinos
Xoco

Operation
The system is run by a private company, Clear Channel Outdoor, but funded by the government with an initial investment of 75 million pesos. Users of the system are required to purchase an RFID card at a cost of 400 pesos which will provide them with access to the bicycles for one year. For tourists, a 7-day card can be obtained for 300 pesos, a 3-day card for 180 pesos, and a single day card for 90 pesos. A smart phone app is also available that uses a QR code scan to rent the bikes. The app is created and managed by Lyft. Use of a bicycle is free for the first 45 minutes; extra charges are applied for use beyond this time limit.

The registration process has been simplified considerably but this is not well known. Updated Ecobici station readers have a credit card slot at the bottom. You can register and pay (with any credit card) very simply by answering a few questions on the screen - no ID required, no passports, no forms to sign. Once you register on the screen, you are given a registration number and you put in your own PIN code. You can then get a bike at any station just using that registration number and PIN.

References

External links

Official website

Community bicycle programs
Transportation in Mexico City
Articles containing video clips
Bicycle sharing in Mexico